A gaurav kanthi, or simply kanthi (kaṇṭhī, . "necklace"), is a basil-seed threaded string worn by some adherents of Hinduism.

In Vaishnavism

Followers of Gaudiya Vaishnavism wear kanthi malas made of Ocimum tenuiflorum (known in Hinduism as tulsi or tulasī). Most Vaishnavas will be given their kanthi by their guru at the time of diksha, or spiritual initiation.

It is said Krishna – who is revered as svayam bhagavān, or the "Self-Existent Lord," in Gaudiya Vaishnavism – was very fond of tulsi, and as such the plant is worshipped as "Tulasī devi" by followers of Krishna. Tulsi devi is considered to be "one of Krishna's most intimate servants" and provide protection to his devotees, and as such, Gaudiya Vaishnavas will try to avoid removing their tulsi kanthis under any circumstances.

In Shaivism
Shaivites wear kanthi made of rudraksha. The name "rudraksha" is derived from the Sanskrit rudrākṣa, meaning "Shiva's eyes".

In other traditions
Kanthi malas are also worn by followers of the Swaminarayan Sampraday and the Kabir panth. Swaminarayan instructed his followers to wear a double-stranded kanthi made of tulsi, symbolising Radha–Krishna, while Kabir instructed his disciples to wear triple-stranded kanthis – symbolising the Hindu trinity of Brahma, Vishnu and Shiva – with one large bead made from either tulsi or rudraksha for Satya Purush, the "supreme lord who dwells within, who is above all else."

References

Hindu symbols
Hindu traditions
Vaishnavism
International Society for Krishna Consciousness
Necklaces
Shaivism